The 1986–87 AHL season was the 51st season of the American Hockey League. 13 teams played 80 games each in the schedule. The league institutes awarding one point in the standings, for an overtime loss.  The league experimented with a shootout to settle games tied after a scoreless overtime period; the format would not be used again until the 2004–05 season.

The Sherbrooke Canadiens finished first overall in the regular season. The Rochester Americans won their fifth Calder Cup championship.

Team changes
 The St. Catharines Saints move to Newmarket, Ontario, becoming the Newmarket Saints.

Final standings
Note: GP = Games played; W = Wins; L = Losses; OTL = Overtime losses; GF = Goals for; GA = Goals against; Pts = Points;

Scoring leaders

Note: GP = Games played; G = Goals; A = Assists; Pts = Points; PIM = Penalty minutes

 complete list

Calder Cup playoffs

Trophy and Award winners
Team awards

Individual awards

Other awards

See also
List of AHL seasons

References
AHL official site
AHL Hall of Fame
HockeyDB

  
American Hockey League seasons
2
2